Biadoliny may refer to the following places in Poland:

Biadoliny Radłowskie
Biadoliny Szlacheckie